Cwmcarn railway station served the village of Cwmcarn, Monmouthshire from 1855 to 1962 on the Ebbw Valley Railway.

History 
The station opened in May 1855 by the Monmouthshire Railway and Canal Company. It closed on 1 July 1876, but reopened as Cwmcarn on 2 March 1925, before closing permanently on 30 April 1962.

References

External links 

Railway stations in Great Britain opened in 1855
Railway stations in Great Britain closed in 1876
Railway stations in Great Britain opened in 1925
Railway stations in Great Britain closed in 1962
1855 establishments in Wales
1962 disestablishments in Wales